The 2022 Campeonato Goiano (officially the GOIANÃO 1XBET 2022 for sponsorship reasons) was the 79th edition of Goiás's top professional football league organized by FGF. The competition began on 25 January and ended on 2 April 2022.

The competition counted with the participation of Goiatuba and Morrinhos (teams promoted from the 2021 Campeonato Goiano da Divisão de Acesso) that occupied the two places of the two 2021 relegated teams. Grêmio Anápolis were the defending champions but they were eliminated in the first stage.

Atlético Goianiense defeated Goiás on aggregate 4–1 winning the Campeonato Goiano for the 16th time.

Participating teams

Format
In the first stage, the 12 teams were drawn into two groups of six teams each.

Each group was played on a home-and-away round-robin basis. The teams were ranked according to points. If tied on points, the following criteria would be used to determine the ranking: 1. Wins; 2. Goal difference; 3. Goals scored; 4. Head-to-head points (only between two teams) 5. Fewest red cards; 6. Fewest yellow cards; 7. Draw. This criteria (except 4) also was used to determine the overall performance in the final stages.

The top four teams of each group advanced to the quarter-finals while the bottom team was relegated to 2023 Campeonato Goiano da Divisão de Acesso.

The final stages were played on a home-and-away two-legged basis. For the semi-finals and finals the best overall performance team hosted the second leg. If the score was level, a penalty shoot-out would be used to determine the winners.

Champions qualified for the 2023 Copa do Brasil and 2023 Copa Verde, while runners-up and third place only qualified for the 2023 Copa do Brasil. Top three teams not already qualified for 2023 Série A, Série B or Série C qualified for 2023 Campeonato Brasileiro Série D.

First stage

Group A

Group B

Final stage

Bracket

Quarter-finals

|}

Group C

Goiás advance to the semi-finals

Group D

Vila Nova advance to the semi-finals

Group E

Iporá advance to the semi-finals

Group F

Atlético Goianiense advance to the semi-finals

Semi-finals

|}

Group G

Goiás advance to the finals

Group H

Atlético Goianiense advance to the finals

Finals

|}

Matches

Overall table

Top goalscorers

References

2022 in Brazilian football leagues
Campeonato Goiano seasons